Francine Cousteau (née Triplet) is the president of the non-profit organization Cousteau Society, and is the widow of oceanographer Jacques-Yves Cousteau. She is the mother of Jacques Cousteau's third and fourth children, Diane and Pierre-Yves.

After Jacques Cousteau's death, Francine became involved in legal battles with family members regarding her husband's financial and spiritual legacies, as well as the salvage and use of RV Calypso.

References

Living people
French businesspeople
Francine
Year of birth missing (living people)